Supersonic Festival was a yearly music festival in Seoul.

Festival line-ups

See also

List of music festivals in South Korea
List of pop festivals

References

External links
  

Music festivals established in 2012
Music festivals disestablished in 2014
Music festivals in South Korea
Pop music festivals
Rock festivals in South Korea
Festivals in Seoul
Music in Seoul
Annual events in South Korea
Summer events in South Korea